(August 15, 1919 in Los Angeles, California-February 5, 1994 in Tokyo) served as a member of the National Executive Council, as well as the National Board of Trustees of the Boy Scouts of Japan.

Narumi was awarded the Eagle Scout in September 1933, the first one for Boy Scouts of America Troop 379 in Los Angeles, and was also a lifetime member of the National Eagle Scout Association. He was among a group including Michiharu Mishima who went to Supreme Commander for the Allied Powers (GHQ) after World War II to get permission to restart the Scouting program in Japan.

He was awarded with the Distinguished Eagle Scout Award by the National Council of the Boy Scouts of America at an annual meeting in New York City May 20, 1976. In 1984, Narumi was awarded the 172nd Bronze Wolf, the only distinction of the World Organization of the Scout Movement, awarded by the World Scout Committee for exceptional services to world Scouting.

He was also awarded the Medal with Blue Ribbon (藍綬褒章, ranjuhōshō) and the Order of Culture (文化勲章, bunka-kunshō) from the Showa Emperor.

References
Dr. László Nagy, 250 Million Scouts, the World Scout Foundation and Dartnell Publishers, 1985
 additional information provided by Richard Seiji Narumi of BSA Troop 379 Drum and Bugle Corps Kōyasan Troop
 NESA database for Distinguished Eagle Scout Awardees

External links

French Scoutopedia article

Full list of Japanese Bronze Wolf recipients
August S. Narumi per 1940 United States Census
 
 
 
 

Recipients of the Bronze Wolf Award
1994 deaths
1919 births
Scouting in Japan
American emigrants to Japan